This article contains a list of fossil-bearing stratigraphic units in the state of Virginia, U.S.

Sites

See also

 Paleontology in Virginia

References

 

Virginia
Stratigraphic units
Stratigraphy of Virginia
Virginia geography-related lists
United States geology-related lists